Culicoides trifidus is a species of Culicoides.

References

trifidus
Insects described in 2004